Krameria lappacea, the para rhatany and Peruvian rhatany, is a plant species in the genus Krameria, in Peru. It is a slow-growing shrub that grows in semi-arid areas of the Andean region. The Latin specific epithet of lappacea is derived from lappa meaning with burrs.

References

  
 Krameria lappacea on www.liberherbarum.com

lappacea
Flora of Peru